The 1980–81 Kansas Jayhawks men's basketball team represented the University of Kansas during the 1980–81 NCAA Division I men's basketball season.

Roster

Schedule

References

Kansas Jayhawks men's basketball seasons
Kansas
Kansas Jay
Kansas Jay
Kansas